The Canton of Rambervillers is a former French administrative and electoral grouping of communes in the Vosges département of eastern France and in the region of Lorraine. It was disbanded following the French canton reorganisation which came into effect in March 2015. It had 13,123 inhabitants (2012).

Positioned within the Arrondissement of Épinal, the canton had its administrative centre at Rambervillers.

Composition
The Canton of Rambervillers comprised the following 29 communes:

Anglemont 
Autrey 
Bazien 
Brû 
Bult 
Clézentaine 
Deinvillers 
Domptail 
Doncières 
Fauconcourt 
Hardancourt 
Housseras 
Jeanménil 
Ménarmont 
Ménil-sur-Belvitte 
Moyemont 
Nossoncourt 
Ortoncourt 
Rambervillers 
Romont 
Roville-aux-Chênes 
Saint-Benoît-la-Chipotte 
Sainte-Barbe 
Saint-Genest 
Saint-Gorgon 
Saint-Maurice-sur-Mortagne 
Saint-Pierremont 
Vomécourt 
Xaffévillers

References

Rambervillers
2015 disestablishments in France
States and territories disestablished in 2015